Makowiec may refer to:

 , a Polish cake (flat or rolled) layered with poppy seed-based paste; see poppy seed roll
 Makowiec, Kuyavian-Pomeranian Voivodeship (north-central Poland)
 Makowiec, Masovian Voivodeship (east-central Poland)